Busseron Township is one of ten townships in Knox County, Indiana. As of the 2010 census, its population was 1,393 and it contained 618 housing units.

History
Busseron Township was founded about 1810. It is named for François Riday Busseron, a French resident of the area during the American Revolution.

Geography

References

External links
 Indiana Township Association
 United Township Association of Indiana

Oaktown, Indiana

 
Townships in Indiana
Townships in Knox County, Indiana